Volodymyr Vusatyi (born 21 August 1954) is a Moldavian professional football manager and former footballer. Since June 2014 he is the head coach of Moldavian football club FC Academia Chişinău.

References

External links
 Vusatyj Vladimir at footballfacts
 Vladimir Vusatîi at soccerway (as manager)
 
 

1954 births
Living people
FC Academia Chișinău managers
Footballers from Vinnytsia
Ukrainian football managers
Moldovan football managers
FC Podillya Khmelnytskyi managers
NK Veres Rivne managers
Moldovan Super Liga managers